"I Guess It Doesn't Matter" is a song by British band Everyday People, released in 1990 as the second single from their only studio album You Wash... I'll Dry. It was written by Shaun Ward and Desi Campbell, and produced by Stewart Levine. "I Guess It Doesn't Matter" reached No. 93 on the UK Singles Chart.

Critical reception
On its release, Music & Media wrote: "Contemporary soul with an infectious beat, some inspired singing and a state-of-the-art production." Peter Kinghorn of the Evening Chronicle praised the song's "catchy medium tempo" and "excellent expressive lead vocal".

In a review of You Wash... I'll Dry, Diana Valois of The Morning Call commented: "With a lead singer like Campbell, the group has a fluid baritone who can ease into mid-range tenor for the warm tremble of "I Guess It Doesn't Matter" or the slow burn of "This Kind of Woman"." Billboard commented: "First single, "Headline News", has begun to ignite attention, though "I Guess It Doesn't Matter" could have even stronger legs."

Formats

PersonnelEveryday People Desi Campbell - lead vocals
 Lloyd T. Richards - guitar
 Shaun Ward - bass, backing vocalsProduction Stewart Levine - producer of "I Guess It Doesn't Matter", remixer on "7" Mix", "Sheffield Dub" and "Snakepass Dub"
 Daren Klein - engineer on "I Guess It Doesn't Matter", remixer on "7" Mix", "Sheffield Dub" and "Snakepass Dub"
 Everyday People - producers of "Inside Your Love"
 Little Louie Vega - remix and additional production on "Inside Your Love", remixer on "Louie's Mix" and "Louie's Dub"Other'
 Ellen von Unwerth - photography

Charts

References

1990 songs
1990 singles
SBK Records singles
Song recordings produced by Stewart Levine